was a Japanese dramatist of jōruri, the form of puppet theater that later came to be known as bunraku, and the live-actor drama, kabuki. The Encyclopædia Britannica has written that he is "widely regarded as the greatest Japanese dramatist". His most famous plays deal with double-suicides of honor bound lovers. Of his puppet plays, around 70 are jidaimono (時代物) (historical romances) and 24 are sewamono (世話物) (domestic tragedies). The domestic plays are today considered the core of his artistic achievement, particularly works such as The Courier for Hell (1711) and The Love Suicides at Amijima (1721). His histories are viewed less positively, though The Battles of Coxinga (1715) remains praised.

Biography
Chikamatsu was born Sugimori Nobumori to a samurai family. There is disagreement about his birthplace. The most popular theory suggests he was born in Echizen Province, but there are other plausible locations, including Hagi, Nagato Province.  His father, Sugimori Nobuyoshi, served the daimyō Matsudaira in Echizen as a medical doctor. Chikamatsu's younger brother became a medical doctor, and Chikamatsu himself wrote a book on health care.

In those days, doctors who served the daimyōs held samurai status. But Chikamatsu's father lost his office and became a rōnin, a masterless samurai. At some point in his teens, between 1664 and 1670, Chikamatsu moved to Kyoto with his father where he served for a few years as an obscure page for a noble family, but other than that, little is known about this period of Chikamatsu's life. He published his first known literary work in this period, a haiku that appeared in 1671. After serving as a page, he next appears in records of the Gonshō-ji (近松寺) temple (long suggested as the origin of his pen name "Chikamatsu", which is kun reading of 近松) in Ōmi Province, in present-day Shiga Prefecture.

With the production in 1683 of his puppet play in Kyoto about the Soga brothers (The Soga Successors or "The Soga Heir"; Yotsugi Soga), Chikamatsu became known as a playwright. The Soga Successors is believed to have been Chikamatsu's first play although sometimes 15 earlier anonymous plays are contended to have been by Chikamatsu as well. Chikamatsu also wrote plays for the kabuki theatre between 1684 and 1695, most of which were intended to be performed by a famous actor of the day, Sakata Tōjūrō (1647–1709). After 1695, and until 1705, Chikamatsu wrote almost exclusively Kabuki plays, and then he abruptly almost completely abandoned that genre. The exact reason is unknown, although speculation is rife: perhaps the puppets were more biddable and controllable than the ambitious kabuki actors, or perhaps Chikamatsu did not feel kabuki worth writing for since Tōjūrō was about to retire, or perhaps the growing popularity of the puppet theater was economically irresistible. C. Andrew Gerstle argues that Chikamatsu's collaborations with various performers affected his development as a playwright. His collaborations with kabuki practitioners led to more realistic characters, while his later collaboration with Takeda Izumo led to a heightened theatricality.

In 1705, Chikamatsu became a "Staff Playwright" as announced by early editions of The Mirror of Craftsmen of the Emperor Yōmei. In 1705 or 1706, Chikamatsu left Kyoto for Osaka, where the puppet theater was even more popular. Chikamatsu's popularity peaked with his domestic plays of love-suicides, and with the blockbuster success of The Battles of Coxinga in 1715, but thereafter the tastes of patrons turned to more sensational gore fests and otherwise more crude antics; Chikamatsu's plays would fall into disuse, so even the actual music would be lost for many plays. He died January 6, 1725, in either Amagasaki in Hyōgo, or Osaka.

In 1706, he wrote a three-act puppet play entitled Goban Taiheiki ("A chronicle of great peace played on a chessboard"), based on the story of the Forty-seven rōnin; this became the basis of the later and much better-known Chūshingura.

Chikamatsu was the first known Japanese playwright who did not act in the pieces he wrote. Currently, 130 plays have been verified to have been authored by Chikamatsu, with another 15 plays (mostly early Kabuki works) suspected to also have been penned by him.

Quotations
 "Art is something that lies in the slender margin between the real and the unreal." — Chikamatsu Monzaemon, Naniwa Miyage

Reception
Chikamatsu's bunraku (jōruri) pieces, of which 24 are sewamono (domestic plays), came to be regarded as high literature in the Meiji and Taishō eras. Many have argued that his genius was “his masterful depiction of the passions, obsessions, and irrationality of the human heart.” While Chikamatsu's jidaimono (history plays) were considered more important in his own time, the domestic tragedies are now “the main focus of critical attention and the more frequently performed”, praised as deeply drawn in their portrayals of commoners. The Love Suicides at Sonezaki (1703), one of the earliest domestic plays in puppet theater, was a hit that revived the fortunes of the Takemoto Theater in Osaka. While it is not considered as strong as his later play The Love Suicides at Amijima (1721), Donald Keene praised the death passage as “one of the loveliest passages in Japanese literature”. Also, it was written in Early Modern Japanese Literature: An Anthology, 1600-1900 that The Drum of the Waves of Horikawa (1707) is “of considerable interest for its exploration of female sexuality and its implicit critique of the life of lower-level samurai”. Rei Sasaguchi listed the same play as one of Chikamatsu's most striking bunraku works along with The Couriers of Love to the Other World.

The Love Suicides at Amijima is generally regarded as the greatest of his domestic plays, though The Courier for Hell (1711), The Uprooted Pine (1718), and The Woman-Killer and the Hell of Oil (1721) have also been praised as works “of exceptional power”. The last of the three initially was not well-received, and acquired a high reputation only in the late 19th century. Robert Nichols wrote that The Almanac of Love (1715) is highly regarded. Kenneth P. Kirkwood argued that the work is somewhat thin in texture but “nevertheless reveals the playwright’s skill in making a dramatic plot out of the slightest materials.” In a review of Gerstle's Chikamatsu: Five Late Plays, Katherine Saltzman-Li praised the "depth of character" achieved in Twins at the Sumida River (1720) through the various allusions.

The histories are mostly considered weaker, with Nichols writing that character in them tends to be subordinated to plot. The Battles of Coxinga (1715), however, ran for seventeen months and became the classical model for later history plays. It remains in the repertoires of both the bunraku and kabuki traditions, and Donald Keene referred to it as the only jidaimono “with real literary value”. Keisei hotoke no hara (1699) and Keisei mibu dainembutsu (1702) are among the most renowned kabuki plays, though Keene argued that even they are “inferior in every respect” to the jōruri works written around the same period. Nichols listed The Courtesan’s Frankincense, The Tethered Steed, and Fair Ladies at a Game of Poem-Cards as the best histories. Anne Walthall at UC Irvine said that the "vivid portrayal of interpersonal relations and individual personality [in Love Suicides on the Eve of the Kōshin Festival] provides excellent evidence why Chikamatsu's domestic plays have become more popular than his historical dramas." "Devil’s Island", the second scene of the second act of Heike and the Island of Women (1719), became part of the kabuki repertory in the 19th century and today is usually performed in jōruri and kabuki as a single play.

Adaptations

Film adaptations 

 Kenji Mizoguchi's black and white film Chikamatsu Monogatari (literally, 'a story from Chikamatsu' but given titles in French "Les amants crucifiées" and in English "The Crucified Lovers"] is a 1954 film based on a domestic lover-suicide play by Chikamatsu called Daikyōji Mukashi Goyomi (1715). 
 Masahiro Shinoda's celebrated 1969 film, Shinjū: Ten no Amijima (billed in English as Double Suicide) employs cinematic techniques based on bunraku conventions and takes as its basis Chikamatsu's play The Love Suicides at Amijima. 

 The Love Suicides at Sonezaki (1978 film)
The Love Suicides at Sonezaki (1981 film)

Opera 

 Japanese composer Mayako Kubo's opera Osan, an adaptation of Shinjū: Ten no Amijima that premiered at the New National Theatre Tokyo in February 2005.

References in popular culture 
In the fictional world of Naruto, the first ninja puppeteer is named Chikamatsu Monzaemon, a reference to Chikamatsu's puppet plays.
 In the Digimon multimedia franchise, a puppet Digimon by the name of Monzaemon—an obvious homage to Chikamatsu—was one of the first characters in the original line of virtual pets.

Major works

Jōruri
 Kagekiyo Victorious (Shusse kagekiyo 出世景清) (1685)
 The Love Suicides at Sonezaki (Sonezaki shinjū 曾根崎心中) (1703)
 The Night Song of Yosaku from Tamba (Tamba Yosaku machiyo no komurobushi 丹波与作待夜のこむろぶし)
 The Courier for Hell (Meido no hikyaku 冥途の飛脚) (1711)
The Almanac of Love (Koi hakke hashiragoyomi) (1715)
 The Battles of Coxinga (Kokusen'ya kassen 国姓爺合戦) (1715)
 The Uprooted Pine (Nebiki no Kadomatsu 寿の門松) (1718)
 The Love Suicides at Amijima (Shinjū Ten no Amijima 心中天網島) (1721)
 The Woman-Killer and the Hell of Oil (Onnagoroshi abura no jigoku 女殺油地獄) (1721)

Kabuki
 The Courtesan on Buddha Plain (Keisei hotoke no hara けいせい仏の原) (1699)

Critical work
 Naniwa Miyage (1738; written by a friend and preserving a number of statements by Chikamatsu on the art of the puppet theater)

Translations into English
 Major Plays of Chikamatsu, translated and introduced by Donald Keene. NY: Columbia University Press. 1961/1990. 

 Chikamatsu: Five Late Plays, translated by C. Andrew Gerstle. 2001. Consists of:
 Twins at the Sumida River (Futago sumidagawa, 1720)
 Lovers Pond in Settsu Province (Tsu no kuni meoto-ike, 1721)
 Battles at Kawa-nakajima (Shinsh kawa-nakajima kassen, 1721)
 Love Suicides on the Eve of the Kishin Festival (Shinju yoigoshin, 1722)
 Tethered Steed and the Eight Provinces of Kanto (Kanhasshu tsunagi-uma, 1724)

See also
 Japanese literature
 List of Japanese authors
 Gagaku

References

Sources

Further reading

 Circles of Fantasy: Convention in the Plays of Chikamatsu by C. Andrew Gerstle. 1986 (a critical study of Chikamatsu's plays).

External links
 "Chapter 4--Renaissance--CHIKAMATSU MONZAEMON (1653-1725)"
 "Four Major Plays of Chikamatsu"
 English translation of The Tethered Steed, translated by Asataro Miyamori and revised by Robert Nichols
 "Audio book read in Japanese"

1653 births
1725 deaths
Bunraku
Kabuki playwrights
Japanese writers of the Edo period
17th-century Japanese dramatists and playwrights
18th-century Japanese dramatists and playwrights
17th-century male writers
18th-century male writers
Japanese male writers
Male dramatists and playwrights
17th-century pseudonymous writers
18th-century pseudonymous writers